Hemichromis letourneuxi is a species of cichlid which is native to West Africa and is popular in the aquarium hobby and it has been introduced to the Caribbean and the south-east United States where it is invasive.

Description
Hemichromis letourneuxi is a small species of fish that has quite a long, thin body and a rounded tail and which has 13–15 spines in the dorsal fin and 3 in the anal fin. It has a highly variable background colour to the body which may be green-yellow to red-brown or even almost black, this colouration is dependent on various factors such as the sex of the fish, the season, the nature of the fish's habitat and stress. Breeding males may develop red colouration over the gills and underside. Both sexes have a limited amount of small, brilliant blue iridescent spots on the head, body, and fins and these may be more obvious in breeding adults. It has a dark black spot situated above the lateral line on the flanks and smaller blotches on gill covers and base of the tail.

Distribution
Hemichromis letourneuxi is found across the northern half of Africa from the River Nile and has been recorded in the Gambia River and Senegal River as well as oases in Algeria. It has been recorded as an introduced species in the Philippines, Hawaii, Europe and Puerto Rico, as well as in Florida. It is only known to have been established in Florida and Puerto Rico, while in other areas they do not seem to have become established or have been misidentified. In Florida they were introduced prior to 1965 and was introduced via the aquarium trade, either by releases or by escapes. They were originally confined to the Miami Canal but have begun to spread northwards and westwards, their wide habitat tolerance aiding their dispersal.

Habitat and biology
Hemichromis letourneuxi is a species found in the savannah zone and it is known to thrive in a variety of still freshwater habitats and it is able to tolerate a wide range of water types from very soft waters through to highly saline waterbodies. It has been recorded from brackish lagoons, large lakes and riverine flood plains. It prefers to live near  vegetation beds and the margins of larger areas of aquatic habitats. Within its introduced range this habitat tolerance has allowed it to spread and it can be found in estuaries and other coastal waters adjacent to the freshwater habitats it occurs in.

The fish of the genus Hemichromis are monogamous, biparental, substrate spawners that demonstrate advanced parental care of their offspring. Congeners of H. letourneuxi, H. bimaculatus and H. lifalili  have had their breeding behaviour studied in aquaria and it is thought to typical of the genus. The male and female form monogamous pairs which are thought to last for the whole of the fishes' lives. When breeding the colours of both sexes become more intense and they choose a spawning site, normally a flat rock. The male will then chase the females, quite vigorously, to induce her to spawn. Spawning is similar to many other cichlids, the female lays a line of eggs and the male fertilises them. The female may lay up to 600 eggs and the male defends the spawning site as the female looks after the eggs. After around 72 hours the eggs hatch and the fry are shifted into a shallow depression in the substrate close to the spawning site. The fry are able to swim freely after 24 hours but the parents will care for them for some time after that. It has been suggested that reproductive activity in Africa coincides with the onset of the flood season.

Studies on the diet of H. letourneuxi have shown that it is an omnivore but that it mainly eats larger invertebrates and small fish, including smaller specimens of its own species and other cichlids. Algae and other plant material has also been found in the stomachs of this species. In Florida this species is preyed upon by the Florida green watersnake as well as by the fishes common snook, Florida gar, Largemouth bass, longnose gar and bowfin. In the Senegal River the gills of this species were found to be parasitized by the monogenean Cichlidogyrus dracolemma.

Etymology
The specific name of this fish honours the collector of the type, the botanist Aristide-Horace Letourneux (1820-1890).

References 

letourneuxi
Fish described in 1880